St Macartan's Cathedral may refer to cathedral churches of the Diocese of Clogher in the following denominations:

Church of Ireland
St Macartan's Cathedral, Clogher 
St Macartin's Cathedral, Enniskillen 

Roman Catholic
St Macartan's Cathedral, Monaghan